Birgit Meineke (later Heukrodt, born 4 July 1964) is a retired East German swimmer. She was the fastest female swimmer in the 100 m freestyle between 1980 and 1984.

Career
Meineke was strongest in the early 1980s, winning a gold medal as part of the East German team for the 4 × 100 m freestyle relay in the 1981 European Aquatics Championships, as well as two silver medals in the same year for the 200 meter and 100 meter freestyle. In the same year, she also established a world record in the short course 100 m freestyle, with a time of 54.04 seconds. While her performance at the 1982 World Aquatics Championships was similarly strong, the pinnacle of her career was a sweep of five golds at the 1983 European Aquatics Championships in Rome.

Meineke was unable to compete in the Olympics due to the boycott of the 1984 Los Angeles Olympics by 14 Eastern Bloc countries, including East Germany. However, she won several medals at the Friendship Games, including two gold medals as part of the teams for the 4 × 100 m freestyle relay and the 4 × 100 m medley relay, the latter of which broke a world record. She ended her swimming career in that year, later becoming a general surgeon.

Meineke was married to canoer Olaf Heukrodt.

East German doping

Like many other East German female athletes, Meineke was subject to systematic administration of performance-enhancing drugs. These caused health problems for her in later life, including a liver tumor she attributed to the use of anabolic steroids and birth control pills.

In 1998, former coach Rolf Gläser admitted to administering steroids to Meineke and her teammates and was fined $4000 for causing bodily harm.

References

1964 births
Living people
Swimmers from Berlin
People from East Berlin
East German female swimmers
East German physicians
East German women
20th-century German physicians
World Aquatics Championships medalists in swimming
European Aquatics Championships medalists in swimming
German sportspeople in doping cases
Doping cases in swimming
German women physicians
German surgeons
20th-century women physicians
Women surgeons
20th-century surgeons